Ice Hockey Center 2004 is an indoor sporting arena located in Chekhov, Russia.  The capacity of the arena is 3,300 (originally 1,370 until 2008), making it the smallest arena in the Kontinental Hockey League.  It is the home arena of the Vityaz Chekhov ice hockey team of the Kontinental Hockey League.

External links

Venue information

Indoor ice hockey venues in Russia
Indoor arenas in Russia
HC Vityaz
Kontinental Hockey League venues